This is a list of the animal breeds of Iceland.

 Icelandic Cattle
 Icelandic Chicken (Islanski hænsnastofninn)
 Icelandic Goat
 Icelandic Horse (Islenski Hesturinn)
 Icelandic Leadersheep
 Icelandic Pig
 Icelandic Sheep 
 Icelandic Sheepdog

References